Manville is an unincorporated community in Newtown Township, Livingston County, Illinois, United States, about  southeast of Streator.

Notes

Unincorporated communities in Livingston County, Illinois
Unincorporated communities in Illinois